Crème de menthe is a Canadian short drama film, directed by Jean-Marc E. Roy and Philippe David Gagné  and released in 2017. The film stars Charlotte Aubin as Renée, a young woman who has been left with the responsibility of cleaning out her hoarder father's apartment after his death. Its cast also includes Macha Limonchik and Fred-Éric Salvail.

The film premiered in the Director's Fortnight stream at the 2017 Cannes Film Festival, and had its Canadian premiere at the 2017 Toronto International Film Festival. It was also screened at the Festival Off-courts de Trouville, where it won the Prix Studio Élément, and at the Quebec City Film Festival, where it won the Prix Public for Best Short Film.

The film received a Prix Iris nomination for Best Live Action Short Film at the 20th Quebec Cinema Awards in 2018.

References

External links

2017 films
2017 short films
Films shot in Quebec
Films set in Quebec
French-language Canadian films
Films directed by Jean-Marc E. Roy
Films directed by Philippe David Gagné
Canadian drama short films
2010s Canadian films